Adrian Brooks (born 2 October 1957) is a former professional footballer who spent two seasons in the North American Soccer League and at least one in the Major Indoor Soccer League. He was a 1977 and 1978 first team All American, coached at the collegiate level and is a sales representative for Adidas.

Brooks attended Philadelphia Textile, playing on the men's soccer team from 1975 to 1978. He was a 1976 second team and 1977 and 1978 first team All American and graduated with a bachelor's degree in business management in 1978. In 1979, the Atlanta Chiefs selected Brooks in the first round of the North American Soccer League draft. He played 29 games in 1979, but only one in 1980. He also played indoor for the Chiefs for one season. In 1980, he moved to the Denver Avalanche of Major Indoor Soccer League where he was named the 1980-1981 All Star Game MVP. In 1982, he moved to the Baltimore Blast, playing two seasons with the Blast. In 1984, Brooks and his teammates won the MISL championship.

He left professional soccer after the championship series. He moved to Atlanta where he played for the Soccer City amateur club for several years. He then moved to Atlanta Datagraphic for several years. In September 1989, Brooks signed with the expansion Atlanta Attack of the American Indoor Soccer Association. He also served as an assistant coach to head coach Keith Tozer. In March 1990, Brooks led the team while Tozer served a game ban after being ejected from a game.

In 1987, Kennesaw State University hired Brooks as the school's head soccer coach. He took the team to a
7–8 record, but the school dropped the soccer program two months later. In 1992, he coached Clayton State University to an 11-5-1 record.

His brother  John Brooks played professionally in the United States.

References

External links
NASL/MISL stats

1957 births
American Soccer League (1933–1983) players
American Indoor Soccer Association coaches
American Indoor Soccer Association players
American soccer coaches
Atlanta Attack players
Atlanta Chiefs players
Atlanta Datagraphic players
Baltimore Blast (1980–1992) players
Denver Avalanche players
Detroit Express (1981–1983) players
English footballers
English expatriate footballers
Living people
Major Indoor Soccer League (1978–1992) players
North American Soccer League (1968–1984) players
North American Soccer League (1968–1984) indoor players
Pennsylvania Stoners players
Philadelphia Rams soccer players
Footballers from Derby
All-American men's college soccer players
Association football midfielders
English expatriate sportspeople in the United States
Expatriate soccer players in the United States